Sea Cadet of Northern Fleet is a 1973 Soviet drama film directed by Vladimir Rogovoy.

Plot 
The film takes place during the war. The film tells about four Soviet boys who go to the Solovetsky Islands to the Jung school, which became for them a real school of growing up and a school of life.

Cast 
 Algis Arlauskas		
 Marat Serazhetdinov
 Igor Sklyar	
 Viktor Nikulin
 Marina Samoylova
 Valeri Ryzhakov		
 Mikhail Kuznetsov
 Boris Grigorev
 Vasiliy Lanovoy
 Boris Gitin

References

External links 
 

1973 films
1970s Russian-language films
Soviet drama films
Films directed by Vladimir Rogovoy
1973 drama films